The men's time trial class C4-5 track cycling event at the 2020 Summer Paralympics took place on 26 August 2021 at the Izu Velodrome, Japan. This combine class (C4-5) under classification C is for cyclists who have impairments that affect their legs, arms, and/or trunk but are still capable to use a standard bicycle. 21 cyclists from 15 nations competed in this event.

Competition format
The competition immediately starts off with the finals, where all 21 cyclists will be divided into their own heat individually (so 1 heat contains 1 cyclist). They will do a time trial basis where the fastest cyclist will win gold, the 2nd fastest a silver, and the 3rd fastest a bronze. The distance of this event is 1000m. Cyclists in class C4 can have a lesser-official time than their real-time due to the athletes factor where in class C4 the factor is 98.91% while C5 is 100.00%, so the time cyclist in class C5 get, will be their official time.

Schedule
All times are Japan Standard Time (UTC+9)

Records
Men's C4 1000m Time Trial

Men's C5 1000m Time Trial

Results

References

Men's time trial C4-5